Tianjin No. 20 High School is a public secondary school in Heping District in Tianjin.

History
Tianjin No. 20 High School is among the first batch of "municipal key schools". It was established in 1952 after the merger of Tianjin Private Zhejiang High School, a secondary school established in 1910, and Jinhua Girls' High School, a secondary school established in 1939. Attached to the high school is a primary school that was established in 1948.

The  selected Tianjin No. 20 High School as an "experimental school" in 2011. In 2016, it completed the requirements to become a "special, distinctive school".

Notable alumni
 Israel Epstein – he attended , the predecessor of Tianjin No. 20 High School.

References

External links
 Official website 

Educational institutions established in 1952
High schools in Tianjin